Alphonse Schmitt (1 December 1875 – 13 February 1912) was a French organist and composer.

Born in Kœtzingue, Alphonse Schmitt was a student of Alexandre Guilmant (c. 1901) and Charles-Marie Widor. He was an organist and composer at the Saint-Philippe-du-Roule church. He left behind a number of organ compositions, of which the Toccatina is still known.

External links 
 Toccatina by Alphonse Schmitt
 Alphonse Schmitt on IdRef
 Epitaphe "in memory of my friend Alphonse Scmitt", Louis Vierne on YouTube

French classical organists
French male organists
19th-century French composers
People from Haut-Rhin
1875 births
1912 deaths
19th-century French male musicians
Male classical organists